Sidney Cartwright (16 July 1910 – 16 December 1988) was an English footballer who played for Arsenal. Arsenal won the old First Division in 1937–38 but he only made six league appearances all season.

References

1910 births
1988 deaths
English footballers
Kiveton Park F.C. players
Arsenal F.C. players
English Football League players
Association football midfielders